Peter Falconer (born 28 November 1937) is a former Australian rules footballer who played for Geelong and Carlton in the Victorian Football League (VFL).

Falconer was a Geelong Amateur before making his senior VFL debut in 1958, replacing club vice-captain Neil Trezise. He had a strong first season and despite missing four games, was Geelong's leading vote getter at the Brownlow Medal. A rover, Falconer was one of the smallest players of his era and also had a good debut season at Carlton. His 30 goals was the second most by a Carlton player that year and he again polled well on Brownlow Medal night, sharing the equal most Carlton votes with Bruce McMaster-Smith. He also appeared in all 20 games that year, including the 1962 VFL Grand Final loss.

References

External links

Holmesby, Russell and Main, Jim (2007). The Encyclopedia of AFL Footballers. 7th ed. Melbourne: Bas Publishing.

1937 births
Living people
Geelong Football Club players
Carlton Football Club players
Australian rules footballers from Victoria (Australia)
People educated at Geelong College